Ajith Kumar Kamraj (born 13 November 1996) is an Indian professional footballer who plays as a defender for Chennaiyin in the Indian Super League.

Career

Chennai City
Kumar started his career with Chennai City FC in 2018.

Bengaluru FC
Kumar later joined Bengaluru FC on 22 August 2020 on a three-year deal with undisclosed transfer fee.

Career statistics

Club

Honours 
Chennai City
 I-League: 2018–19

References

Living people
Indian footballers
Chennai City FC players
Bengaluru FC players
Association football defenders
Indian Super League players
I-League players
Footballers from Chennai
1996 births